Benjaminiola is a genus of moths of the family Noctuidae.

Species
 Benjaminiola colorada (Smith, 1900)

References
 Benjaminiola at Markku Savela's Lepidoptera and Some Other Life Forms
 Natural History Museum Lepidoptera genus database

Hadeninae